The Oldsmobile Diesel engine is a series of V6 and V8 diesel engines produced by General Motors from 1978 to 1985. The  V8 was introduced in 1978, followed by a  V8 only for the 1979 model year. In 1982, a  V6 became available for both front and rear-wheel drive vehicles. Sales peaked in 1981 at approximately 310,000 units, which represented 60% of the total U.S. passenger vehicle diesel market. However, this success was short-lived as the V8 diesel engine suffered severe reliability issues, and the engines were discontinued after the 1985 model year.

V8 engines

LF9
The LF9 is a  diesel V8 produced from 1978 to 1985. Earlier versions and those used in pickups (1978-1981) produced  and  torque, while later versions produced   and  torque.

Applications:
1981 Buick Century
1980–1984 Buick Electra
1982–1985 Buick LeSabre
1981–1985 Buick Regal
1981–1985 Buick Riviera
1980–1984 Cadillac de Ville
1979–1985 Cadillac Eldorado
1980–1985 Cadillac Fleetwood Brougham
1978–1985 Cadillac Seville
1980–1982 Checker Marathon
1981–1985 Chevrolet Caprice
1982–1984 Chevrolet El Camino
1981–1985 Chevrolet Impala
1982–1983 Chevrolet Malibu
1982–1984 Chevrolet Monte Carlo
1978–1981 C10 pickup
1982–1984 GMC Caballero
1978–1981 C1500 pickup
1978–1985 Oldsmobile Custom Cruiser
1978–1983 Oldsmobile Cutlass Cruiser
1978–1980 Oldsmobile Cutlass Salon
1978–1985 Oldsmobile Cutlass Supreme/Cutlass Calais
1978–1985 Oldsmobile Delta 88
1978–1984 Oldsmobile Ninety-Eight
1979–1985 Oldsmobile Toronado
1980–1984 Pontiac Bonneville
1980–1981 Pontiac Catalina
1981–1984 Pontiac Grand Prix
1981–1985 Pontiac Parisienne

LF7
The short-lived LF7 is a  V8 putting out  and  torque.

Applications:
1979 Oldsmobile Cutlass Salon
1979 Oldsmobile Cutlass Supreme/Cutlass Calais

V6 engines
In 1982, GM introduced a 4.3-liter V6 for longitudinal and transverse applications.

LT6
The LT6 was produced from 1982 to 1984 and installed in rear-wheel drive vehicles.

Applications:
1982–1984 Buick Regal
1982–1983 Chevrolet Malibu
1982–1983 Chevrolet Monte Carlo
1982–1984 Oldsmobile Cutlass Supreme/Cutlass Calais

LT7
The LT7 is a transverse engine version produced from 1982 to 1985.

Applications:
1982–1985 Buick Century
1982–1985 Chevrolet Celebrity
1982–1985 Oldsmobile Cutlass Ciera
1982–1985 Pontiac 6000

LS2
The LS2 was produced only in 1985 and installed in front-wheel drive vehicles.

Applications:
1985 Buick Electra
1985 Cadillac de Ville
1985 Cadillac Fleetwood
1985 Oldsmobile Ninety-Eight

Problems
While designing the original 350 cu in diesel, Oldsmobile left the head bolt design and pattern unchanged to enable them to use the same tooling as for the gasoline engines, unlike a proper gasoline to diesel conversion. This led to catastrophic head bolt failures as diesel engines have compression ratios that are as much as three times higher than a gasoline engine. The sales and reliability woes were compounded by a decline in gas prices as well as fuel quality issues were experienced, including large volumes of diesel fuel containing water or foreign particles.

In addition to the head bolt issues, General Motors also decided not to install a water separator in order to cut costs. Low quality diesel fuel was a common problem at the time and most diesels were thus equipped to keep the injector pumps from corroding. Many owners tried to solve this by adding anhydrous alcohol, a common trick to deal with water in fuel, but this instead dissolved fuel pump seals and other parts. The stretchy fuel-pump timing chain was a minor problem in light of the other issues, but poor dealer service training only made all the problems worse. One Oldsmobile engineer who had worked on the project told his bosses not to release the hastily developed engine. General Motors, needing to meet upcoming CAFE standards forced him into early retirement and released the engine nonetheless.

Myriad lawsuits were filed as several grassroots groups formed to try to get General Motors to acknowledge the problem, made worse by simultaneous problems with GM's new THM200 automatic transmission. The California Air Resources Board (CARB) had been unable to certify the diesel V8 for sale in the state in 1979 and early 1980 as the test cars issued to CARB broke down before the tests could be completed. Of the nine cars supplied to CARB, all suffered engine problems and seven had transmission failures. In 1980 the Federal Trade Commission filed a complaint which included the diesel engine issues and the transmission troubles as well as camshaft issues with gasoline V8s. General Motors kept marketing the diesel to the fullest, with 19 of the 23 Oldsmobile models in 1981 being available with the 5.7 diesel.

The later 4.3-liter V6 engine, which arrived for the 1982 model year, did not have the same problems as the V8. The V6 has a denser bolt pattern and Oldsmobile's engineers were given more time to develop and test it. General Motors also carried out several redesigns of the V8's heads, bolts, and various other parts, but by the time the engine was trouble-free the damage had already been done.

Discontinuation
While customer complaints started dropping off after 1981, sales did too: diesels sold 43 percent less in 1982. The downward sales slide continued, not helped by stricter emissions standards - for the 1984 model year the diesel V8 was no longer offered in California for that very reason. General Motors had built a whole new plant for the V6 diesel, but sales thereof never broke 30,000 annually. Production ran at less than ten percent of capacity and much of the tooling had never even been unpacked by the time it was discontinued.

In December 1984, General Motors announced the Oldsmobile Diesel engines would be discontinued during the 1985 model year. GM continued to offer Isuzu's 1.8-liter four cylinder diesel in the Chevrolet Chevette/Pontiac 1000, but after only 588 of these were sold in 1986, the company went on to abandon the diesel passenger car segment entirely for many decades. A class action lawsuit eventually forced General Motors to pay up to 80 percent of the costs of new engines. Used car price guides have always indicated much lower prices for diesel-engined cars and they remain undesirable in the collector's market. A large number of cars simply had their broken diesels replaced with conventional gasoline engines.

The Oldsmobile diesel's reputation for unreliability and anemic performance damaged the North American passenger diesel market for the next 30 years. Although the engines were unreliable because of the head and problems with the ancillaries, the Oldsmobile diesels' strong blocks continue to see use in gasoline-powered race engines.

See also
List of GM engines

References

Diesel
V6 engines
V8 engines